Monaco-Monte-Carlo station (French: Gare de Monaco-Monte-Carlo; Monégasque: Staçiun de Munegu-Munte-Carlu) is the sole railway station in the Principality of Monaco, though part of it is located in Beausoleil, France. It is served by trains of the French state-owned operator SNCF, on the Marseille–Ventimiglia railway line. The station, along with the entire railway line in the principality, is located underground.

History
The railway line from Marseille reached Monaco in 1868. The station, originally named Monaco (Gare de Monaco), was renamed Monaco-Monte-Carlo in the 1950s, after the building of a new tunnel bypassing a second SNCF station named Monte-Carlo (closed in 1965).

In the early 1990s, it was decided to re-route the railway completely underground and build a new station closer to the centre of Monaco. Construction commenced in 1993; the new station opened on 7 December 1999, replacing the former surface station from then on. There are three tracks through the station (accessed from a side platform on the south side) and an island platform between the two tracks to the north.

Monte-Carlo Country Club halt
A single platform halt is located at the eastern end of the Monaco tunnel, over the Monaco border in Roquebrune-Cap-Martin, France. It provides access to the Monte-Carlo Country Club (also itself located in France) and is only operational during the Monte Carlo Masters tennis tournament each April. It is served by TER services between Cannes and Ventimiglia. Its platform is located on the southern side of the line.

Train services
The majority of trains serving Monaco-Monte-Carlo are local TER Provence-Alpes-Côte d'Azur services between Marseille-Saint-Charles and Ventimiglia in Italy, close to the France–Italy border. There are also a small number of TGV services from the Gare de Lyon in Paris.

The station is served by the following services:

High speed services (TGV) Paris – Avignon – Cannes – Nice – Menton
Local services (TER Provence-Alpes-Côte d'Azur) Grasse – Cannes – Nice – Monaco – Ventimiglia

See also 
 Rail transport in Monaco
 List of SNCF stations in Provence-Alpes-Côte d'Azur

References

External links 

 
  

Railway stations in Monaco
Railway stations in Alpes-Maritimes
Railway stations in France opened in 1999
TER Provence-Alpes-Côte-d'Azur